The Tasmanian State Masters Tournament is an annual Tenpin Bowling tournament competed in by adult-age, open-grade male and female bowlers that are residents of Tasmania and are sanctioned members of the sport's governing body, Tenpin Bowling Australia (TBA Limited) and formerly the Australian Tenpin Bowling Congress (ATBC) until it collapsed in 1998.

History
The tournament has run annually since 1971 and was staged each year at Moonah Bowl (renamed Zone Bowling Moonah on 1 May 2018) in Hobart until the mid-1980s when bowling centres were opened in Devonport, Launceston, Burnie (closed in January 2006) and Mornington (which was based on Hobart's Eastern Shore and closed in August 1992), which saw the tournament being shared between these venues. 
Qualification for the men's finals usually involve a three-game series rolled on the Saturday, with the top eight to eleven bowlers (depending on entry numbers) and the reigning champion all progressing to the finals stage on the Sunday. 
The finalists usually bowl between eight and eleven games with the highest pinfall determining the winner, whilst the women's division generally don't have a qualification day due to generally low numbers of participants at that level and play their final alongside the men on the Sunday with the number of games to be determined dependent on entry numbers. 
Masters Champions from each year are then given automatic qualification and free entry into the Australian Masters Tournament staged in different venues across Australia annually.

There have been a total of forty-eight Tasmanian State Masters tournaments since its inception in 1971 and the player with the most titles is Devonport's Ashley Riley who has won it on twelve occasions between 1995-2018 whilst the women's record is held by former Queenslander, Debbie Riley (formerly Bowtell) now of Devonport with six titles between 2002-2011.

Tasmanian State Masters Champions: 1971-2018

 Notes: Female surnames in brackets denote current married names.

External links
 Tenpin Bowling Tasmania - Masters Winners

Sports competitions in Tasmania
Recurring sporting events established in 1971
Ten-pin bowling in Australia